Caché is an album by saxophonist Kirk Whalum issued in 1993 on Columbia Records. The album reached No. 1 on the Billboard Top Contemporary Jazz Albums chart and No. 39 on the Billboard Top Jazz Albums chart.

Overview
Artists such as Gerald Albright, Brenda Russell, Angela Bofill, Jevetta Steele and Nile Rodgers guested upon the album.

Covers
Whalum covered "Fragile" by Sting, Karyn White's "Love Saw It", "Over the Rainbow" by Judy Garland and Everything but the Girl's  "The Language of Life".

Tracklisting

Personnel
Gerald Albright - alto saxophone 
Anas Allas - assistant engineer
Jearlyn Steele Battle - backing vocals 
Peter Beckerman - assistant engineer
Poogie Bell - drums
Gary Bias - alto saxophone
Steven Birch - programming
Angela Bofill - vocals
Dean Brown - electric guitar
Ray Brown - contractor, trumpet
Robbie Buchanan - arranger, drum programming, keyboards, producer, programming
Carl Burnett - guitar
Carl Burnette - guitar
Eric Calvi - engineer, mixing
Bill Cantos - keyboards, piano, programming
Brad Cole - arranger, keyboards, programming
Michael Davis - trombone
Julie Delgado - backing vocals
Michael Dumas - assistant engineer
Wilton Felder - bass
Lynn Fiddmont - backing vocals
Ernie Fields Jr. - baritone saxophone
André Fischer - arranger, producer
Ray Fuller - guitar
Preston Glass - arranger, keyboards, percussion, producer
Bibi Green - production coordination
Tyrone Griffen - programming
Kevin Guillaume - backing vocals
Noel Hazen - assistant engineer
Natalie Jackson - backing vocals
Paul Jackson, Jr. - guitar
Rick Jackson - piano
Bob James - piano
Amy Keyes - backing vocals
Brian Kilgore - percussion
Jay Landers - engineer
Ricky Lawson - drum programming, drums, producer, programming, synthesizer, synthesizer bass
Randy Long - assistant engineer
Kenny MacDougald - drums
Brian Malouf - mixing
Olivia McClurken - backing vocals
Pat McDougal - mixing
Marcus Miller - bass guitar 
Darren Mora - assistant engineer
Rob Mullins - keyboards
Billy Murrell - copyist
Christine Navarez - assistant engineer
Charles Paakkari - assistant engineer
Brett Perry - engineer
Jerry Peters - keyboards, organ, producer, string arrangements
Greg Phillinganes - keyboards, piano
Malcolm Pollack - remixing
Robert Read - assistant engineer
Chris Rich - assistant engineer
Darryl Richards - tenor saxophone
  Carlos Rios - guitar
Nile Rodgers - rhythm guitar
Roger Rosenberg - baritone saxophone
Brenda Russell - vocals, backing vocals
Hal Sacks - engineer, mixing, producer
Philippe Saisse - arranger, keyboards, producer, programming, backing vocals
Deborah Samuel - photography
Duane Sexton - assistant engineer, mixing assistant
John Siket - assistant engineer
Akohie Silas - backing vocals
Alfie Silas - backing vocals
Jeremy Smith - engineer
Kent Smith - trumpet
Andy Snitzer - alto saxophone
Maurice Spears - bass trombone 
Jevetta Steele - vocals, backing vocals
Rose Stone - vocals, backing vocals
Vaneese Thomas - backing vocals
Don Tittle - engineer, mixing
Charles Veal - strings
Lori-Ann Velez - backing vocals
Chris Walker - bass
"Ready" Freddie Washington - bass
Kevin Whalum - producer, backing vocals
Kirk Whalum - mouthpiece, producer, programming, reeds, soprano and tenor saxophone
Fred White - contractor, percussion, backing vocals
Christian "Wicked" Wicht - assistant producer, programming
James Williams - backing vocals
James "D-Train" Williams - backing vocals
Dave Willis - programming
Joe Wolfe - programming, synthesizer, synthesizer programming
Jeffrey "Woody" Woodruff - engineer, mixing
Reggie C. Young - trombone
Vittorio Zammarano - engineer
Joel Zimmerman - art direction, design

References

1993 albums